Grey Lady is a 2017 American film directed by John Shea.  The film centers on a Boston homicide detective, Doyle (Eric Dane) who searches for clues about a serial killer that murdered both his sister and his partner (Rebecca Gayheart). His search leads him to Nantucket where he uncovers secrets about his family's past.

Plot
Boston homicide detective, James Doyle, and his partner/girlfriend, Maggie Wynn are called by their commander and alerted of a 911 call made by a woman claiming to be stalked by a man addressing her as Deirdre (the name of Doyle's sister who was murdered weeks earlier)  Doyle and Wynn rush to the scene and discover it is a trap.  Wynn is stabbed by the woman who called and they are both shot by an unknown man.  Doyle survives and Wynn is killed.

Weeks later, Doyle is on leave and is taking the boat to Nantucket. During the voyage he meets two women, Eli, and the Duchess. Upon arrival, he is greeted by a local officer Detective Johnson who directs him to his hotel.  After checking in, he meets the police chief Preston MacGuire. who tells him that time on the island will help him emotionally recuperate.   Doyle and Johnson later attend an outdoor barbecue and concert where Doyle encounters the two women he saw on the boat. Later, the Duchess is found dead. Doyle surmises she was murdered by the same parties that killed his partner and sister due to similar wounds on their backs carved with a knife.  Doyle then recalls that his aunt Lola used to live on the island and he makes an attempt to locate her. During a flashback Doyle recollects that Maggie whispered "The Rose, The Crown" in his ear while she was dying. He then goes to the Rose and Crown restaurant thinking it may be a clue.  The local bartender does not recognize his aunt by name, but Doyle notices a photo on the wall of 3 people, one of which he has a hunch might be his aunt. The bartender tells him one of the other people in the picture, Tony used to work there and she sends him to his home. When he is there, he shows Tony the photo, and they walk inside. The woman in the photo, Angela tells Doyle his aunt died the previous year. He leaves his business card at the house and leaves. Upon leaving it is revealed that Eli and another man were spying on him

Back at his hotel, Doyle attends an art gallery opening the Duchess had invited him to.  While there, he purchases a painting which reminds him of Maggie. The artist, Melissa Reynolds introduces herself. Eli is also in the gallery and spills wine on another painting. The artist, Clara asks to be treated to a couple of pints of beer at the gallery's after-party as compensation. After dinner, the woman, Eli becomes ill and her companion takes her home. She is very upset and the man injects her with a sedative. They then look at pictures of the murder victims on their phone and it is revealed that they are the killers.

The next morning, Doyle, Melissa, Clara and another artist from the party, Billy MacLeod, are scalloping on the beach. Melissa and Doyle are dropped off at her dockside studio  after she has a panic attack and Doyle is picked up by Johnson.  Eli and her companion show up at the house where Angela lives and take Tony hostage and torture him for information, and cut off one of his fingers.  Doyle shows up unexpectedly and Eli keeps Tony quiet. Tony's friend Junior shows up as Doyle is leaving. Junior seeing a stranger in the house, runs over to his home to retrieve a shotgun. In a subsequent shootout, Eli shoots at Angela, whom she addresses as Lola. Junior is wounded and Eli and her companion flee. Doyle later has a late night meal with Melissa and he explains to her what is going on.   That morning, Eli's companion has a massage appointment with Clara whom he murders. When her body is found on the beach, a wound is found carved on her back.  Fearing Melissa might be in danger he calls her and tells her to go to his hotel.  Eli shows up and tells Melissa that Clara was found murdered. She has another panic attack and a friend drives her to the hospital.  Eli picks her up and introduces her companion as her brother Perry.  While Doyle is at the house where Clara was attacked, he examines photos of the wounds and realizes that the carvings are actually letters and that the killers are spelling his last name.  Doyle's phone rings and a local priest tells him that a woman is there who wants to speak with him at the church.  When he arrives he sees Angela who is really his aunt Lola.  Lola reveals that the killers are his cousins who falsely believe that Doyle's father Frank killed their father Tim.  Lola reveals that she stabbed her husband because he attacked her in a fit of drunken rage while finding her in bed with his brother Frank.  Tony shows up and wants in on capturing Eli and Perry as revenge for cutting off his finger. As Doyle is leaving, Lola implores that he not kill Perry and whispers something in his ear.

Back at the hotel, Doyle calls Melissa's phone and hears it ring in the hotel. Eli is there and tells Doyle that Melissa dropped it before going to the hospital and that she is with Perry.  She draws a map to where they are staying.   Doyle, knowing that Melissa is being held hostage alerts Tony who meets up with Doyle at the house. Doyle and Tony attempt to get Perry to surrender. Perry is wounded in the leg by a shot from Tony's crossbow and hides in a garage. Melissa is rescued and told to hide. Hearing a siren, she rushes towards it only to find Eli driving a stolen police car and shooting at her. She hides under a canoe and Eli fails to locate her.  Doyle is chasing Perry but is stopped by Eli saying she will kill Melissa if he does not let them escape. Doyle drops his gun. Melissa shows up and fires a shot. Eli attempts to shoot Melissa but is fatally shot by Doyle instead. Perry then tells Doyle to kill him too, but he refuses, saying that Lola revealed that Perry is actually his half-brother from Lola's relationship with Frank.

The following morning, a crowd gathers on the beach for a memorial service for Clara,  Lola gives Doyle his father's old movie camera. The following morning, Perry is in custody and being escorted back to the mainland by the state police.   Doyle is on the boat's upper deck and reminisces about happier times with his family

Production
Production commenced in April 2014, with four weeks of filming on Nantucket followed by one week in Boston.

Release
The film premiered at the 2015 Nantucket Film Festival, and public screenings commenced on April 28, 2017. The film was released on DVD, and video on demand services on June 27, 2017.

References

External links

 http://www.starzglobal.com/title?id=462  Starz Worldwide

2015 films
2010s crime drama films
2010s mystery films
American crime drama films
American mystery films
American serial killer films
Films about Irish-American culture
Films directed by John Shea
Films set in Boston
Films shot in Massachusetts
Nantucket in fiction
Films set in the Atlantic Ocean
2010s English-language films
2010s American films